T4F – Time For Fun is a Brazilian entertainment company, being the third largest live entertainment company in Latin America and one of the largest in the world according to Billboard, T4F also won the Top International Promoter 2009 done by the Billboard Touring Awards. The company operates in the concerts, theaters, art events, family and football sector in Brazil, Argentina and Chile.

Currently T4F operates five of the most important entertainment venues in South America, of which four are ranked among the top 50 venues worldwide in terms of number of tickets sold in 2010, according to Pollstar.

The venues of T4F are Credicard Hall, Citibank Hall and Teatro Abril, located in São Paulo, Citibank Hall in Rio de Janeiro and Ópera Allianz in Buenos Aires. With the exception of Ópera Allianz hall, which T4F owns, all the venues are leased from third parties.

References 

Companies based in São Paulo
Companies listed on B3 (stock exchange)
Entertainment companies of Brazil